Harrington Park is the name of the following places:
Harrington Park, New Jersey, a borough in Bergen County, NJ, USA
Harrington Park, New South Wales, a suburb of Sydney, New South Wales, Australia
Harrington Park (homestead), a heritage-listed homestead located within the suburb of Harrington, New South Wales